In tooth development, the hyaline layer of Hopewell-Smith is the most peripheral layer of initially unmineralized dentin that forms immediately subjacent to the cementodentinal junction (CDJ).  It eventually mineralizes, but not before the rest of the dentin is already mineralized.  It is 0.5-0.8 µm thick and contains enamel matrix-like protein as well as the proteins one would expect to find in dentin.  It is into this hyaline layer that the initial fibers of the periodontal ligament embed themselves.

The hyaline layer aids cementum in binding to the dentin.

The rationale behind the use of enamel matrix derivative proteins, such as Emdogain, in trying to stimulate reproduction of cementum in periodontal bony defects is based on the presence of enamel matrix-like proteins within the hyaline layer.

References

Tooth development